Cyrus Walker was a sidewheel tug active in Puget Sound in the second half of the 19th century.

Career
Domingo Marcucci built the Cyrus Walker at San Francisco, California at his Steamboat Point shipyard in 1864, for Pope & Talbot.  She was 120 foot long side-wheel steamboat, with a 28-foot beam and an 8-foot hold.  She was equipped with two high-pressure steam engines and a surface condenser.  George W Bullene, who put machinery in her at the Pacific Iron Works, then took her up to Puget Sound for towing logs for the Pope & Talbot lumber mill on Puget Sound. 

Captain Bullene delivered Cyrus Walker to Port Gamble, Puget Sound in October, 1864.  It was active at least as late as 1893.

References

 Affleck, Edwin L, ed. A Century of Paddlewheelers in the Pacific Northwest, the Yukon, and Alaska, Alexander Nicholls Press, Vancouver, BC (2000) 

1864 ships
Steam tugs
Steam tugs of Washington (state)
Steamboats of Washington (state)
Sidewheel steamboats of Washington (state)
Passenger ships of the United States